Ménier Island is an island, the largest in a small island group lying in the mouth of Flandres Bay,  northeast of Cape Renard, off the west coast of Graham Land, Antarctica. The island group was discovered by the Third French Antarctic Expedition, 1903–05, under Jean-Baptiste Charcot, who gave them the name "Iles Ménier." The name Ménier is now applied to the largest of these islands.

See also 
 List of Antarctic and sub-Antarctic islands

References

Islands of Graham Land
Danco Coast